Museum of Eroticism (French: Musée de l'érotisme) was a sex museum in Paris devoted to the erotic art collections of antique dealer Alain Plumey and French teacher Jo Khalifa. It closed its doors on November 7th, 2016. Founded in 1997, the museum was situated in the Pigalle district of Paris, at 72 Boulevard de Clichy. The collection ranged from the ancient religious art of India, Japan and Africa right up to contemporary art with an erotic focus. There were five floors, including a basement exhibition. One floor was devoted to maisons closes, the legal brothels of the 19th and early 20th century.

The film Polisson et galipettes was shown; it is a collection of pornographic shorts formerly exhibited in the maisons closes. The upper two floors had revolving exhibitions, mainly of contemporary artists. It was visited by the main character in the novel Merde Actually, the sequel to A Year in the Merde.

In 2013, erotic artist Namio Harukawa exhibited "Garden of Domina" at the museum, which featured art of dominatrixes facesitting on submissive males.

Gallery

See also 
 List of museums in Paris
 List of sex museums

References

External links 

 Museum website

Museums established in 1998
Museums in Paris
Sex museums
Buildings and structures in the 18th arrondissement of Paris
Prostitution in Paris